Gianni is an Italian name (occasionally a surname), a short form of the Italian Giovanni and a cognate of John meaning God is gracious. Gianni is the most common diminutive of Giovanni in Italian.

People with this given name

 Gianni Agnelli (industrialist)
 Gianni Alemanno (politician)
 Gianni Amelio (film director)
 Gianni Baget Bozzo (Roman Catholic priest and political expert)
 Gianni Bellocchi (scientist)
 Gianni Brera (journalist)
 Gianni Bugno (cyclist)
 Gianni Danzi (Roman Catholic bishop)
 Gianni Davito (high jumper)
 Gianni De Biasi (Italian football coach)
 Gianni De Fraja (economics professor)
 Gianni De Michelis (politician)
 Gianni Garko (actor, born Giovanni Garcovich)
 Gianni Ghidini (cyclist)
 Gianni Infantino (President of FIFA)
 Gianni Letta (politician)
 Gianni Mina (tennis player)
 Gianni Minà (journalist)
 Gianni Morandi (singer)
 Gianni Morbidelli (Formula One driver)
 Gianni Motta (cyclist)
 Gianni Pettenati (singer)
 Gianni Riotta (journalist)
 Gianni Rivera (footballer)
 Gianni Rodari (writer)
 Gianni Romme (skater)
 Gianni Russo (actor)
 Gianni Stensness (footballer)
 Gianni Togni (singer)
 Gianni Vattimo (philosopher)
 Gianni Vella (artist)
 Gianni Vernetti (politician)
 Gianni Versace (fashion designer)
 Gianni Vignaduzzi (track cyclist)
 Gianni Zuiverloon (footballer)

People with this surname
Alberto Gianni (1891–1930), Italian diver
Dimitrie Gianni (1838–1902), Romanian politician
Gary Gianni (born 1954), American comics artist
Lapo Gianni (died after 1328), Italian poet
Mario Gianni (1902–1967), Italian footballer
Matthieu Gianni (born 1985), Italian footballer
Nicolás Gianni (born 1982), Italian footballer
Paul Gianni, Australian paralympic athlete
Patrizia Gianni (born 1952), Italian mathematician

Fictional people with this name
 Gianni di Marco, a character on the British TV show Eastenders, portrayed by actor Marc Bannerman.

See also
 Gianni di Parigi (opera)
 Gianni Schicchi (opera)
 Janni
 Yianni (disambiguation)
 Yanni (disambiguation)
 Johnny (disambiguation)
 Alternate forms for the name John

Italian masculine given names
Italian-language surnames
Surnames from given names